The National Society of Metal Mechanics (NSMM) was a trade union in the United Kingdom which existed between 1872 and 1985.

History

The organisation was founded in Birmingham in 1872 as the Amalgamated Brassworkers Society.  Led for many years by William John Davis, it was soon renamed the National Society of Amalgamated Brassworkers.  In 1919, members rejected a proposal to join the Amalgamated Society of Engineers, and instead chose to expand the union's remit, renaming the body as the National Society of Brass and Metal Mechanics.  By 1920, it had 37,363 members, but it suffered during the Great Depression, and this figure fell to 15,000 by 1937.

In 1985, the union merged with the Technical, Administrative and Supervisory Section; at this point, its membership was 27,000.

General Secretaries
1872: William John Davis
1883:
1888: William John Davis
1921: Arthur H. Gibbard
1940s: Arthur Penny
1955: V. M. Robus
1962: Frank Briggs
1975: J. H. Wood
1981: Charles P. McCarthy

References

External links
Catalogue of the NSMM archives, held at the Modern Records Centre, University of Warwick

Defunct trade unions of the United Kingdom
Metal trade unions
1872 establishments in the United Kingdom
Trade unions established in 1872
Trade unions disestablished in 1985
Trade unions based in the West Midlands (county)